Major-Brigadeiro Trompowsky Airport  is the airport serving Varginha, Brazil. The airport is named after Armando Figueira Trompowsky de Almeida (1889-1964) former Minister of the Brazilian Air Force.

Airlines and destinations

Access

See also

List of airports in Brazil

References

External links

Airports in Minas Gerais